The Faculty of Medicine - Syrian Private University was founded in 2005.
It is the second faculty of medicine in a private university in Syria.

Departments

 Anatomy, Embryology and Genetics: curriculum includes Embryology, Anatomy (1, 2, 3 and 4) and Genetics.
 Histology, Pathology and Forensic Medicine: curriculum includes Histology (1 and 2), Pathology (1, 2), and Forensic Pathology and Toxicology.
 Department of Biology, Microbiology and Immunology: curriculum includes Biology and Cell Biology, Microbiology (1 and 2), and Immunology.
 Department of Chemistry and Molecular Biology: curriculum includes General and Organic Chemistry, Medical Biochemistry (1 and 2), and Clinical Chemistry.
 Department of Physiology and Pharmacology: curriculum includes Physiology (1, 2 and 3), and Pharmacology (1 and 2).
 Department of Diagnostic Radiology, Radiotherapy and Medical Physics: curriculum includes Radiology and Radiotherapy, and Medical Physics.
 Department of Internal Medicine: curriculum includes Internal Medicine 1 (symptoms, diagnosis) and 2 (digestive and blood disorders) and 3 (cardiovascular and respiratory) and 4 (neurological disease and kidney disease) and 5 (musculoskeletal diseases and infectious diseases) and 6 (glands, metabolism, nutrition and aging), Psychiatry, Dermatology and Sexually Transmitted Diseases.
 Department of Surgery: curriculum includes surgery 1 (Microsurgery) and 2 (General Surgery, Abdominal Surgery) and 3 (Cardiovascular and Respiratory) and 4 (Neurology, Genito-Urinary and Pediatrics) and 5 (Orthopedic and Cosmetic); Emergency Medicine and Anesthesia and recovery, Otolaryngology, Ophthalmology and surgery.
 Department of Pediatrics: curriculum includes Pediatric (1 and 2)
 Department of Obstetrics and Gynecology: curriculum includes Gynecology and Obstetrics (1 and 2),
 Department of Community Medicine: courses include Public and Occupational Health, Epidemiology, Biostatistics, Preventive Medicine and Family Medicine.
 Department of Medical Education and Clinical Training: oversees strategic planning, development of curriculum teaching and learning mechanisms, clinical training and related activities.

International Recognition
 The Faculty of Medicine of Syrian Private University is listed in the World Health Organization's Avicenna directory.
 The Faculty of Medicine of Syrian Private University is listed in the ECFMG IMED/FAIMER database of medical schools.
 FAIMER SCHOOL ID: F0002430

University Hospitals And Educational Facilities
 On-campus teaching medical center (200 beds, 8 operating rooms (OR), radiology department, central lab, outpatient department, emergency department).
 Other affiliated hospitals include:
 Obstetrics and Gynecology University Hospital.
 Children's University Hospital(435 beds).
 Damascus Hospital(645 beds).
 Dermatology Hospital(34 beds).
 Alzahrawi Hospital.

Study Program
The medical curriculum is 6 years long, the first 3 years are the basic science and the last 3 years are the clinical education.

Degree awarded by the Faculty
The Faculty of Medicine of Syrian Private University based on the decree of the council of the Faculty of Medicine awards successful graduating students Doctor of Medicine (M.D.) Degree.

External links
 Syrian Private University
 On-campus Teaching Medical Center

References

Buildings and structures in Damascus
Syrian Private University
Schools of medicine in Syria